Sérgio Henrique Santos Gomes (born 4 September 1994) is a Brazilian professional footballer who plays as forward for FC Cincinnati of Major League Soccer.

Early life
Santos was born in Belo Horizonte, Brazil. Growing up in the Ana Lucía neighborhood of Belo Horizonte, Santos worked as a bricklayer and construction worker to help his family. Santos joined América Mineiro at age nine beginning his development into a professional.

Playing career

Audax Italiano 

In 2014, Santos began exploring professional options in Chile. After trying negotiations with Palestino and Magallanes, he signed with Audax Italiano. In August 2018, Santos signed a contract extension with Italiano through mid-2020. Santos scored nine goals in 16 league appearances during the 2018 season for Audax and was the club's leading scorer. He helped the club qualify for the 2018 Copa Sudamericana and reach the Copa Chile final, where the side finished as runners-up to Palestino.

Philadelphia Union 
On 14 December 2018, signed with Philadelphia Union competing in Major League Soccer. The signing was completed for approximately $500,000 transfer fee and as a TAM-level player. After a slow start due to injuries, Santos scored his first two goals for the Union on May 5 versus New England Revolution in a 6–1 victory. Santos would finish his first season with four goals and one assist.

While the 2020 season was disrupted by COVID-19 pandemic, Santos found his footing with the Union scoring the first goal of the season against Los Angeles FC. In October during a top of the table match-up, Santos scored his first professional hat trick against Toronto FC (the fourth in Union history); earning him MLS Player of the Week honors. The season would end with the Union earning their first trophy in club history, the 2020 Supporters' Shield, leading the team with eight goals.

FC Cincinnati 
On 8 July 2022, Santos was acquired from the Philadelphia Union by FC Cincinnati, joining the club in exchange for $300,000 in allocation money, with an additional $625,000 dependent on performance-based metrics or contract conditions being met. Philadelphia will receive a percentage of a future trade if Santos is traded to another MLS club.

Career statistics

Club

Honours
Philadelphia Union
Supporters' Shield: 2020

References

External links
 
 

1994 births
Living people
Brazilian footballers
Brazilian expatriate footballers
Chilean Primera División players
Audax Italiano footballers
Philadelphia Union players
Philadelphia Union II players
FC Cincinnati players
Brazilian expatriate sportspeople in Chile
Expatriate footballers in Chile
Expatriate soccer players in the United States
Footballers from Belo Horizonte
Association football forwards
Major League Soccer players
USL Championship players